United Nations Security Council Resolution 346, adopted on April 8, 1974, thanked the nations who contributed to the emergency force established in resolution 340 and agreed with the opinion of the Secretary-General; that the separation of the Egyptian and Israeli forces was only the beginning to a peaceful settlement of the issue and called upon member states to continue to support the emergency force.

The resolution was adopted unanimously with 13 votes to none, while two members, Iraq and the People's Republic of China, did not participate in the voting.

See also
 List of United Nations Security Council Resolutions 301 to 400 (1971–1976)
 Yom Kippur War

References 
Text of the Resolution at undocs.org

External links
 

 0346
Arab–Israeli peace process
Yom Kippur War
April 1974 events